The Secretary's Distinguished Service Award is an award of the United States Department of State. It is presented at the discretion of the Secretary of State in recognition of exceptionally outstanding leadership, professional competence, and significant accomplishment over a sustained period of time in the field of foreign affairs. Such achievements must be of notable national or international significance and have made an important contribution to the advancement of U.S. national interests.

The award is personally authorized by the Secretary of State provided that one of the criteria eligibility in Foreign Affairs Manual is met. It may be presented to members of the foreign affairs communities.

The award consists of a gold medal set and a certificate signed by the Secretary of State. The specific criteria for the issuance of the Secretary’s Award is determined by the Secretary of State.

Nominating and approval procedures
Nominations for the Secretary's Distinguished Service Award are normally initiated by the Secretary of State. However, officials at assistant secretary or higher level who wish to recommend an individual for this award may do so by submitting a memorandum of justification, cleared by the Director General, to the Executive Secretary of the Department.

Military use
Upon authorization, members of the U.S. military may wear the medal and ribbon in the appropriate order of precedence as a U.S. non-military personal decoration.

Notable recipients
 Kristie Kenney, former U.S Ambassador to Thailand, the Philippines, Ecuador and former Counselor of the State Department
 Marca Bristo, disability rights activist
 Constance Berry Newman, former U.S. Assistant Secretary of State for African Affairs, September 2005
 Daniel Bennett Smith, U.S. Ambassador to Greece
 David Petraeus, General, U.S. Army
Raymond T. Odierno, General, U.S. Army
Lloyd Austin, General, U.S. Army
William M. Fraser III, General, U.S. Air Force
Colin Powell, General, U.S. Army and former U.S. Secretary of State 
John Beyrle, former U.S. Ambassador to Russia and Bulgaria 
Llewellyn Thompson, Ambassador to the Soviet Union 
Earl R. Miller, former U.S. Ambassador to Bangladesh and Botswana, issued on May 20, 2022.

See also
Awards of the United States Department of State
Awards and decorations of the United States government
United States Department of State
United States Foreign Service

References

Awards and decorations of the United States Department of State
Distinguished service awards
United States Department of State